Městský stadion v Kotlině is a football stadium in Varnsdorf, Czech Republic. It is the home stadium of FK Varnsdorf. The stadium holds 5,000 spectators, of which 900 can be seated.

External links
 Photo gallery and data at Erlebnis-stadion.de

Football venues in the Czech Republic
FK Varnsdorf